The 2005 Los Angeles Angels of Anaheim season was the franchise's 45th since its inception. The regular season ended with a record of 95–67, resulting in the Angels winning the American League West division title for the second consecutive season, their fifth in franchise history.

In the postseason, the Angels defeated the New York Yankees in the American League Division Series, 3–2, but were subsequently defeated by the eventual World Series champion Chicago White Sox in the American League Championship Series, 4–1.

The season was the first the team played under its controversial "Los Angeles Angels of Anaheim" moniker.

Offseason
October 20, 2004: Adam Riggs was released by the Anaheim Angels.
December 14, 2004: Paul Byrd was signed as a free agent with the Anaheim Angels.

Regular season

Season standings

Record vs. opponents

Roster

Player stats

Batting
Note: Pos = Position; G = Games played; AB = At bats; H = Hits; Avg. = Batting average; HR = Home runs; RBI = Runs batted in

Other batters
Note: G = Games played; AB = At bats; H = Hits; Avg. = Batting average; HR = Home runs; RBI = Runs batted in

Starting pitchers 
Note: G = Games pitched; IP = Innings pitched; W = Wins; L = Losses; ERA = Earned run average; SO = Strikeouts

Other pitchers 
Note: G = Games pitched; IP = Innings pitched; W = Wins; L = Losses; ERA = Earned run average; SO = Strikeouts

Relief pitchers 
Note: G = Games pitched; W = Wins; L = Losses; SV = Saves; ERA = Earned run average; SO = Strikeouts

Postseason
With their win on Monday, September 27, 2005, the Angels clinched their second straight American League West championship.

American League Division Series

The 2005 American League Division Series featured the AL West champion Los Angeles Angels of Anaheim and the AL East champion New York Yankees. The series began on October 4, 2005 with the Angels splitting the first two games at Angel Stadium. The Angels then proceeded to split the two games at Yankee Stadium and finally won the fifth game at Angel Stadium ultimately winning the series 3–2.

American League Championship Series

The 2005 American League Championship Series featured the AL West champion Los Angeles Angels of Anaheim and the AL Central champion Chicago White Sox. The series began on October 11, 2005 with the Angels winning the first game at U.S. Cellular Field, but after an incredibly controversial second game loss, the Angels dropped the next three and lost the series 4–1. Because of the controversy surrounding game two, Angel fans to this day (as of the 2013 season) give A. J. Pierzynski a poor welcome at Angel Stadium.

Game log

|- align="center" bgcolor="ffbbbb"
| 1 || October 4 || Yankees || 4–2 || Mussina (1–0) || Colón (0–1) || Rivera (1) || 45,142 || 0–1 || Angel Stadium of Anaheim || 
|- align="center" bgcolor="bbffbb"
| 2 || October 5 || Yankees || 5–3 || Escobar (1–0) || Wang (0–1) || Rodríguez (1) || 45,150 || 1–1 || Angel Stadium of Anaheim || 
|- align="center bgcolor="bbffbb"
| 3 || October 7 || @ Yankees || 11–7 || Shields  (1–0) || Small (0–1) || || 56,277 || 2–1 || Yankee Stadium || 
|- align="center" bgcolor="bbbbbb"
| | || October 8 || @ Yankees || colspan=4 |Postponed (rain); Rescheduled for October 9 || || 2–1 || Yankee Stadium ||
|- align="center bgcolor="ffbbbb"
| 4 || October 9 || @ Yankees || 3–2 || Leiter (1–0) || Shields (1–1) || Rivera (2) || 56,226 || 2–2 || Yankee Stadium || 
|- align="center bgcolor="bbffbb"
| 5 || October 10 || Yankees || 5–3 || Santana (1–0) || Mussina (1–1) || Rodríguez (2) || 45,133 || 3–2 || Angel Stadium of Anaheim || 
|-

|- align="center" bgcolor="bbffbb"
| 1 || October 11 || @ White Sox || 3–2 || Byrd (1–0) || Contreras (1–1) || Rodríguez (3) || 40,659 || 1–0 || U.S. Cellular Field || 
|- align="center" bgcolor="ffbbbb"
| 2 || October 12 || @ White Sox || 2–1 || Buehrle (2–0) || Escobar (1–1) ||  || 41,013 || 1–1 || U.S. Cellular Field || 
|- align="center" bgcolor="ffbbbb"
| 3 || October 14 || White Sox || 5–2 || Garland (1–0) || Lackey (0–1) ||  || 44,725 || 1–2 || Angel Stadium of Anaheim || 
|- align="center" bgcolor="ffbbbb"
| 4 || October 15 || White Sox || 8–2 || García (2–0) || Santana (1–1) ||  || 44,857 || 1–3 || Angel Stadium of Anaheim || 
|- align="center" bgcolor="ffbbbb"
| 5 || October 16 || White Sox || 6–3 || Contreras (2–1) || Escobar (1–2) ||  || 44,712 || 1–4 || Angel Stadium of Anaheim || 
|-

Bracket

Note: Major League Baseball's playoff format automatically seeds the Wild Card team 4th. Normally, the No. 1 seed plays the No. 4 seed in the Division Series. However, MLB does not allow the No. 1 seed to play the 4th seed/Wild Card winner in the Division Series if they are from the same division, instead having the No. 1 seed play the next lowest seed, the No. 3 seed.

Farm system

References

2005 Los Angeles Angels of Anaheim team page at Baseball Reference
2005 Los Angeles Angels of Anaheim team page at www.baseball-almanac.com

Los Angeles Angels seasons
Los Angeles Angels Of Anaheim Season, 2005
American League West champion seasons
Los